Jayapal Mukund Jayakar (born 1912 - 1 January 1981), was the first Indian to receive a commission in the Royal Air Force (RAF), and became a flying ace. He conducted the 24 Indian pilots seconded to the UK in 1940. He was the son of M. R. Jayakar.

References

1912 births
1981 deaths
Place of birth missing
Non-British Royal Air Force personnel of World War II